A shrug is a cropped, cardigan-like garment with short or long sleeves cut in one with the body, typically knitted. Generally, a shrug covers less of the body than a vest would, but it is more tailored than a shawl.  Shrugs are typically worn as the outermost layer of an outfit, with a full shirt, tank top, or dress beneath.

Like the shrug, the sides of the bolero only meet at one point.

See also 
 Zouave jacket

References 

Sweaters
Women's clothing